The Yellow Court Classic ("Huang Ting Jing", 黄庭经), a Chinese Taoist meditation text, was received from the unknown source (according to a lore, as a Heavenly Scripture from the Highest Purity Realm) by Lady  Wei Huacun, one of the founders of Highest Purity Tradition (Shangqing, 上清),  in the 288 CE. The first reference to the text appears in the archives of the famous alchemist and collector of Taoist texts, Ge Hong (葛洪) in the 4th century CE.

Structure and content 
The manuscript comprises the two parts, the External (Wai, 外) and Internal (Nei, 内) Scenery Scripture. All characters of the shorter (100 verses) text of the External Scripture are fully contained in the longer (435 verses) text of the Internal Scripture. Together, both of the texts are also referred to (within the manuscript itself) as "Jade Book" or "Jade Writing". Fourth century “Sage of Calligraphy”, Wang Xizhi (王羲之) presented the full text of the Internal Scenery Scripture of the Yellow Court on the stone tables in his classic artwork, a well-known masterpiece of the Chinese calligraphy .

The literal meaning of the “’’Yellow Court’’’ refers to the central area of the Emperor’s Castle where the Emperor and Ministers gather to try to understand the will of the Heavens and properly regulate the businesses of the Kingdom.  The Yellow color indicates Earth element that is central in the Five Element (Wu Xing, 五行) arrangement. The four sides of the Castle Architecture symbolize the other four elements (Metal, Water, Wood and Fire), while the Heaven symbolizes the Spirit. The overall picture presents an allegory to a harmony between human body, particularly the spleen (the Earth element of Yellow color, central of the Five Organs) which is associated the lower reservoir of qi in the body (Dantian, 丹田), and Nature.

The text of the Yellow Court scriptures provides meditation instructions for the practitioner’s alignment with the Universe and its Spiritual Laws and Forces (symbolized by “Heaven”), in the order to regulate and improve functions and processes of the body (symbolized by “Kingdom”). Such Life Cultivation, or Internal Alchemy work should, according to the text, result in the enhanced health and longevity of a diligent practitioner.  Carl Jung referred to this mechanism, in his multiple works, including the commentary of The Secret of the Golden Flower, as the Individuation. However, in addition to the psychological aspect analyzed by Jung, the Taoist Alchemy process also emphasizes energetic and physical changes in the practitioner’s body, as the components of the holistic personal enhancement.

The key component in the meditative practice of The Yellow Court Classic is, however, focused on the cooperation with the heavenly spirits (Shen, 神), which are assumed to form the “intelligent”, organizational aspects of the human existence. In addition to the specific locations in the body (like lungs, kidneys, liver, heart, spleen etc.), the nature and mission of these, personified, spirits are designated by color, material and shape of the clothes they wear. The colors usually indicate one of the Five Elements, for instance “red” is associated to the “Heart” and the “Fire” element. The other attributes of the spirits are symbolically associated to the concepts of Yin Yang, Eight Trigrams (Bagua, 八卦) of I Ching etc. The text of the scripture gradually develops a systematic description of main body elements and functions, as aspects of the Universal Spiritual Harmony in the Human Being.

History 
Since fourth century, this classic visualization (Fabrizio Pregadio) text has been regularly used in the practice of the Highest Purity (also called Supreme Purity) lineage, as well as the other schools of Taoism.  Lü Dongbin (吕洞宾), a historical figure, that is also honored in Chinese folklore as a Deity/Immortal,  had integrated the material from The Yellow Court Classic into his own practice and  referenced some parts in his scripture: The Secret of the Golden Flower, that has been later translated by Thomas Cleary (sinologist) and Richard Wilhelm and commented by Carl Jung. The version of Richard Wilhelm is not well translated and is based on a truncated Chinese text. The version of Thomas Cleary is preferable, well translated and complete.

References

Sources
 Andersen, Paul, The Method of Handling the Three Ones: A Taoist Manual of Meditation of the Fourth Century A.D., Curzon Press, 1980
 Balfour, Frederick, Taoist Texts: Ethical, Political and Specultative, Tribner and Co./Kelly and Walsh, 1894
 Imios Archangelis, Miaoyu Lanying, Jade Writing (Yellow Court Classic), Createspace, 2010
 Lu Dong Bin, Richard Wilhelm, Carl Gustav Jung, The Secret of the Golden Flower, A Harvest HBJ Book 1962
 Robinet, Isabelle. Daoism: Growth of a Religion, translated by Phyllis Brooks. Stanford: Stanford University Press, 1997.
 Wong, Eva. Teachings of the Tao. Boston: Shambhala, 1997.
Fabrizio Pregadio. The Golden Elixir Blog .

External links
 Sample page of the Yellow Court Classic calligraphy
 Work of Wei Huacun (in Chinese)
 Jade Writing (Yellow Court Classic): Individual Phase Space User Manual
 Secret of the Golden Flower
 Taoist Inner Gods

Chinese philosophy
Chinese classic texts
Taoist texts